The following lists the results of every season of the Chicago Cubs baseball club of Major League Baseball beginning in 1870 and continuing to 1876 as a charter member of the National League (NL).  The White Stockings changed their name in 1890 to the Chicago Colts and again in 1898 to the Chicago Orphans until finally settling in 1903 with the name of the Chicago Cubs.

While the organization Major League Baseball recognizes only seasons in select leagues from 1876 to the present as major league, many baseball historians consider major league baseball to have started earlier.  Some include seasons from the National Association, and others include its predecessor organization, the National Association of Base Ball Players.

The Chicago Cubs have completed 150 seasons of baseball, second only to the Atlanta Braves at 151. Within this time, the Cubs have won 17 National League pennants, 3 World Series championships, 3 pre-World Series Championships, and tied for 2 pre-World Series Championships.  By virtue of their pennants and playoff championships, the Cubs can claim to be the best team in baseball in eight different seasons.

The Cubs have been members of three organized leagues, beginning with the amateur National Association of Base Ball Players in 1870, followed by three seasons in the professional National Association of Professional Base Ball Players, and the National League since 1876.

Year by year

Record by decade 
The following table describes the Cubs' MLB win–loss record by decade.

All-time records

As of September 30, 2019

Footnotes

References
General

 
 
 
 
 
 
 

Specific

 
Major League Baseball teams seasons
Seasons